Stephen Henry Sholes (February 12, 1911 – April 22, 1968) was a prominent American recording executive with RCA Victor.

Career
Sholes was born in Washington, D.C. and moved with his family to Merchantville, New Jersey, at the age of nine, near where his father worked in the Victor Talking Machine Company plant in Camden. Sholes started work at Victor as a messenger boy in 1929 and worked part-time for the firm while a student at Rutgers University.

Scholes worked for a time in RCA Victor's radio division, but his experience playing saxophone and clarinet in dance bands led him to the record division. During World War II, he worked in the Army's V-disc operation, which made records for radio broadcast and for personal use by army personnel.

In 1945, he became head of the country division in Nashville, Tennessee and was responsible for recruiting such talent as Chet Atkins for RCA Victor. When he left Nashville, Atkins took over as head of the country music division. In the 1940s Sholes signed Eddy Arnold, The Browns, Hank Locklin, Homer and Jethro, Hank Snow, Jim Reeves, and Pee Wee King. In 1955, he signed Elvis Presley to RCA Victor. He eventually had fifteen chart topping hit singles in the UK as a  record producer for Presley.  In 1982 he reached fourth place on the list of most successful record producers on the UK charts.

In 1957, Sholes convinced RCA to build its own recording studio in Nashville on Seventeenth Avenue South; this would become RCA Studio B. The same year, he became the company's pop singles manager, then pop singles and albums manager in 1958, and West Coast manager in 1961. The latter promotion took him to Los Angeles, California. In 1963, Sholes became RCA Victor vice president for pop A&R and returned to New York.

He served on the Country Music Association (CMA) and Country Music Foundation (CMF) boards of directors. Sholes was inducted into the Country Music Hall of Fame, which he had worked to create, in 1967.

Sholes died in Nashville of a heart attack at the age of 57. At the time of his death he was visiting to see his longtime friends, Homer and Jethro, record a live album at Vanderbilt University. He was driving to the school when he was stricken.

Sholes was portrayed by actor Bart Hansard in the CBS mini-series Elvis (2005).

References

Rumble, John. (1998). "Steve Sholes". In The Encyclopedia of Country Music. Paul Kingsbury, Ed. New York: Oxford University Press. p. 483.

External links
 http://www.geocities.com/shakin_stacks/stevesholes.txt
 http://www.countryworks.com/artist_full.asp?KEY=SHOLES
 Country Music Hall of Fame profile of Stephen H. Sholes (listed as Stephen Sholes).

1911 births
1968 deaths
Record producers from New Jersey
American music industry executives
Country Music Hall of Fame inductees
People from Merchantville, New Jersey
Rutgers University alumni
20th-century American businesspeople